Roy Knyrim (born 1966/1967) is an American film director and special effects makeup artist. He directed Demons at the Door (2004), Cemetery Gates (2006), Night Skies (2007), and Death Racers (2008). His credits as a special effects and makeup artist include the fourth, fifth, and sixth films in the Children of the Corn film series, as well as A Nightmare on Elm Street 5: The Dream Child (1989), Gods and Monsters (1998), 2001 Maniacs (2005), and Death House (2017). He also provided miniature models for such films as The Abyss (1989), Tremors, Darkman (both 1990), and Freddy's Dead: The Final Nightmare (1991).

Knyrim heads the special effects workshop SOTA FX (State of the Art Effects).

Early life and education
Knyrim was born in Hilton, New York. He began creating special makeup and creature effects in his second grade of elementary school, and filmed them using super 8 film. He has stated, "Mostly I did those in my basement. Friday the 13th was a big influence, but I made up my own stuff. They were a lot of slash, a lot of splat. A couple of them were pretty good – but most of them were garbage. I was in a hurry to do them and get them developed so I could look at them and show them." Knyrim graduated from Hilton High School in 1985.

Career

Knyrim's early credits as an effects artist include the Troma Entertainment films The Toxic Avenger Part II and The Toxic Avenger Part III: The Last Temptation of Toxie, both released in 1989.

After moving to southern California, Knyrim, along with Jerry Macaluso and Patrick Tantalo, founded the special effects workshop and production company SOTA FX (State of the Art Effects). With SOTA FX, Knyrim has provided special effects makeup on a number of films, including the 1998 film Gods and Monsters, as well as the television series Weird Science.

Knyrim directed the 2004 direct-to-video horror film Demons at the Door, which features music by the American hip hop duo Insane Clown Posse. According to Fangoria, by May 2006, during the production of the Knyrim-directed horror film Cemetery Gates, he had "a slew of Insane Clown Posse videos under his belt". Following the release of Cemetery Gates later that year, Knyrim went on to direct the 2007 science-fiction horror film Night Skies and the 2008 action film Death Racers, the latter of which features Insane Clown Posse in acting roles. Knyrim is co-directing the upcoming horror comedy film Sorority of the Damned alongside Joe Davison, who will also star in the film.

Selected filmography

Film

As director/writer

As special and visual effects/makeup artist

Television

Music videos
 "Boogieman" by Twiztid, 2015

References

Bibliography

External links
 
 SOTA FX Studio on Facebook

Film directors from New York (state)
American make-up artists
Horror film directors
Special effects people
1960s births
Living people